James Craig (1823–1874) was an Ontario farmer and political figure. He represented Glengarry in the Legislative Assembly of Ontario as a Conservative member from 1867 to 1874.

The son of James Craig and Helen Frue, he was born in Charlottenburg Township in Upper Canada in 1823. He was a farmer and was also involved in the timber trade. He served on the township council, becoming reeve, and was elected county warden in 1862. He died at Summerstown in 1874.

In 1851, he married Flora McLeod. His son James also served in the Ontario assembly.

References

External links

1823 births
1874 deaths
Progressive Conservative Party of Ontario MPPs
Mayors of places in Ontario
People from the United Counties of Stormont, Dundas and Glengarry